Tommy Tabermann (3 December 1947, Ekenäs – 2 July 2010, Helsinki) was a Finnish contemporary poet and politician, radio personality and journalist. Since 1998 and until 2006 he was known to Finnish audiences for his witty role as team captain in the weekly Saturday night television show Uutisvuoto, the Finnish version of Have I Got News For You, opposite the bestselling author Jari Tervo. Tervo recently characterised his popularity with the following anecdote: "When he was sixty, nine out of ten persons in an elevator at the Stockmann department store (in Helsinki) recognised him. The tenth person was Japanese."

He left the show in the spring of 2007 in order to run for the Parliament of Finland. Running as a Social Democrat Party candidate, he secured a nomination with 4,972 votes.

Tabermann came from a bilingual Swedish-Finnish family, both languages having been spoken in his childhood home. Despite being bilingual he wrote all his books in Finnish.

In August 2009 Tabermann was diagnosed with a malignant brain tumor. He died on 2 July 2010. He is buried in the Hietaniemi Cemetery in Helsinki.

Tabermann was first and foremost known as a love poet, and was actually sometimes referred to as an "apostle of love". His good friend and Uutisvuoto co-team captain Jari Tervo wrote of his feelings for Tabermann with the following words: "Now I personally know what the price of love is: it is sorrow."

Lähikuvassa Tommy Tabermann, a biography of the poet by Juha Numminen, was released in the autumn of 2010.

Bibliography

 Ruusuja Rosa Luxemburgille, 1970
 Kun kaikki kellot sydämessä soivat, 1972
 Aivan kuin joku itkisi, 1973
 Tähtiä kämmenellä, 1974 (reprinted 1995)
 Päivä päivältä rakkaampaa, 1975
 Kaipaus, 1976
 Anna minä kumoan vielä tämän maljan, 1977
 Suudelma, 1977
 Kukkiva kivi, 1978
 Jumalatar, 1979
 Kipeästi keinuu keinumme, 1979
 Ihmisen ääni, 1979 (a collection of essays)
 Intohimon panttivanki, 1980
 Vedenpaisumus, 1981
 Pennissimo, 1982
 Ylistyslauluja ihanalle ruumiillesi, 1983
 Täyttymyksen jano, 1983
 Pienten kerjäläisten rukouskirja, 1984
 Tosimies vie eikä vikise, 1984 (together with Seppo Hyrkäs)
 Nälän ja selibaatin runot, 1985
 Rukous viinille, kivulle, naurulle ja työlle, 1985
 Tapani tulette tuntemaan, 1985 (with Seppo Hyrkäs)
 Rohkeus, 1986
 Kerubi, 1987
 Maa Ilma Tuli Vesi, 1987
 Tulevaisuus on rakkauden vihollinen, 1988
 Unelmien kapina, 1989
 Martyyrit, 1990
 Lauluja suuresta halusta, 1991
 Soturi, 1992
 Ihon ääni, 1992
 Courage — matkakirje miehuudesta, 1992
 Oljenkorsia — värssyjä ettei virta veis, 1993
 Rakkaudesta ja pyhästä vihasta, 1994
 Sallittu hedelmä, 1994
 Bryssä tulee, 1994 (with Seppo Hyrkäs)
 Janus, 1995
 Aistien alamainen, 1995
 Duende, 1996
 Unta ja verta, 1997
 Desire, 1997
 Sallittu hedelmä, 1998 (expanded edition)
 Demoni, 1998
 Ihme nimeltä Me, 1999
 Oodeja kahdelle iholle, 2000
 Maalliset mantrat, 2000
 Julian parveke, 2000
 Passionata, 2001
 Luovuuden lumous, 2002
 Fatiman neljäs ennustus, 2002
 Alaston, 2003
 Yksinäinen tyttö ja yksisarvinen, 2003
 Kirje nuorelle rakastajalle. Ihmisen ääni nro 36, 2003
 Vernazzan valot, 2004
 Kiitti vitusti -kappale, 2004
 Rakkauden kolme kehää, 2005
 Perhonen paidan alla, 2005
 Suutele minulle siivet, 2006
 Pelastaja, 2006

References

1947 births
2010 deaths
People from Raseborg
Social Democratic Party of Finland politicians
Finnish male poets
Swedish-speaking Finns
Deaths from brain cancer in Finland
20th-century Finnish poets
Burials at Hietaniemi Cemetery
Finnish television personalities
20th-century male writers